Thomas Acland may refer to:

 Sir Thomas Dyke Acland, 7th Baronet (1722–1785), MP for Devon 1746–1747 and Somerset 1767–1768
 Sir Thomas Dyke Acland, 9th Baronet (1752–1794), son of the 7th Baronet
 Sir Thomas Dyke Acland, 10th Baronet (1787–1871), MP for Devonshire and Devonshire North, son of the 9th Baronet
 Sir Thomas Dyke Acland, 11th Baronet (1809–1898), MP for Devon North and Somerset West, Privy Counsellor, son of the 10th Baronet
 Sir Thomas Dyke Acland, 12th Baronet (1842–1919), British politician, son of the 11th Baronet

See also 

 Acland baronets
 Thomas Dyke Acland Tellefsen, Norwegian composer